The County of Zutphen, located in modern-day Gelderland, a province of the Netherlands, was formed in the eleventh century as a fief of the Bishop of Utrecht. It was ruled by the Counts of Zutphen between 1046 and 1138, and then formed a  personal union with Guelders. Later, it became one of the 4 quarters of Guelders. After the Act of Abjuration, the three Dutch quarters merged their representation in the Staten of Guelders and Zutphen with a joint delegation to the States General of the Netherlands, effectively ending Zutphen individuality. The name Graafschap (county) is still used for the Achterhoek, the region east of Zutphen, and for the football club De Graafschap from this region.

Cities

 Zevenaar and some of its surroundings were, as being a part of the former Cleves Enclaves, a small district in the Duchy of Cleves.

 
History of Gelderland
Achterhoek